Hockey Club '05 Banská Bystrica is a professional Slovak ice hockey club based in Banská Bystrica, Slovakia. They won 3 times Slovakian hockey league and 4 times Slovak 1. Liga, second–level ice hockey league in Slovakia. The team is nicknamed Barani, which means Rams in English.

History

Czechoslovak era
HC '05 was founded in 2005 but professional hockey in Banská Bystrica was playing long before. The previous club was established in 1922. The club was named Slávia but later changed name several times. In 1962, the club was named Iskra (Spark in English) and this name kept up until 2005. In interwar period and during the World War II, the club played in the Slovak League. Their best placement was second in 1930, 1931, and 1934. They were members of the first postwar Czechoslovak Extraliga season. In the 1945–46 season, they finished 6th in Group A and were relegated from the Top level. Banská Bystrica returned to the Extraliga in the 1947–48 season but they finished 6th in Group A and were relegated again. This season was their last at the Top level until the 1995–96 Slovak Extraliga season. Since 1963–64, Iskra played in the 1. SNHL (1st Slovak National Hockey League), the second level in Czechoslovak hockey. They were members of all seasons of the 1. SNHL since its introduction in 1963 until dissolution of league in 1993. Iskra won the 1. SNHL in the 1968–69 season and qualified for the preliminary round of the Czechoslovak Extraliga. They lost 5 of 6 games in the preliminary round against Škoda Plzeň, VŽKG Ostrava, and Mladá Boleslav and were not promoted to the Extraliga.

Slovak era
After dissolution of Czechoslovakia in 1993, the club was included to the Slovak 1.Liga, the second level in Slovak hockey. In their first season, they finished second. In the next season, Iskra won the 1. Liga and was promoted to the Slovak Extraliga. Iskra placed ninth in the 1995–96 season and they had to play the relegation round. Iskra saved the Extraliga for the 1996–97 season but this season was less productive and they were relegated from the Top level. They returned in the 1998–99 season but were relegated again, by missing the cut by three points. In 2005, the club was transformed to an incorporated company and renamed to HC '05. They were promoted to the Extraliga in the 2007–08 season after their victory in the playoffs finals against HK Spišská Nová Ves. In the 2010–11 season, they finished third in the regular season, defeated their big rival HKm Zvolen in the quarterfinals, and lost 3–4 against HK Poprad in the semifinals. This season was their most successful since their 1. SNHL victory in 1969.

Honours

Domestic

Slovak Extraliga
  Winners (3): 2016–17, 2017–18, 2018–19
  Runners-up (2): 2014–15, 2015–16
  3rd place (2): 2010–11, 2013–14

Slovak 1. Liga
  Winners (4): 1994–95, 1997–98, 2005–06, 2007–08
  Runners-up (2): 1993–94, 1999–2000
  3rd place (1): 2006–07

Slovak Hockey League
  Runners-up (1): 1938–39
  3rd place (1): 1939–40

1st. Slovak National Hockey League
  Winners (1): 1968–69
  Runners-up (3): 1965–66, 1975–76, 1986–87
  3rd place (2): 1981–82, 1990–91

Pre-season
Tatra Cup
  Winners (1): 2022

Players

Current roster

NHL alumni

  Ivan Majeský (1999, 2015–2017)
  Vladimír Mihálik (2016–2020)
  Vladimír Országh (1996, 2009–2010)
  Michal Handzuš (1994–1996, 2014–2017)
  Tomáš Surový (1998–2000, 2016–2019)
  Clayton Stoner (2012–2013)
  Richard Zedník (1992–1994, 2010–2011)
  Jozef Čierny (2005–2006)
  Jason Bacashihua (2015–2017)
  Colby Cohen (2014–2015)
  Zdeněk Nedvěd (2009–2010)
  Nathan Lawson (2016–2017)
  Tanner Glass (2012–2013)
  Theo Peckham (2014–2015)
  Dana Tyrell (2012–2013)
  Akim Aliu (2017)
  Colton Gillies (2015–2016)
  Ty Wishart (2016–2017)
  Mike Danton (2012–2013)
  Eric Selleck (2018–2019)

References

External links
 Official club website

Notes

Banska Bystrica
2005 establishments in Slovakia
Ice hockey clubs established in 2005